Jonathan Kimble Simmons (born January 9, 1955) is an American actor, considered one of the most eminent character actors of his generation. He has appeared in over 200 films and television roles since his debut in 1986. He is the recipient of various accolades, including an Academy Award, a British Academy Film Award, a Screen Actors Guild Award, and a Golden Globe Award.

His film roles include J. Jonah Jameson in Sam Raimi's Spider-Man trilogy (2002–2007), tobacco industry executive B.R. in Thank You for Smoking (2006), Mac MacGuff in Juno (2007), music instructor Terence Fletcher in Whiplash (2014), for which he won the Academy Award for Best Supporting Actor, Bill in La La Land (2016), Commissioner James Gordon in the DC Extended Universe film Justice League (2017), and William Frawley in Being the Ricardos (2021), for which he received another nomination for the Academy Award for Best Supporting Actor. He reprised his role as Jameson in various Marvel media unrelated to the Raimi trilogy, including multiple animated series, the Marvel Cinematic Universe films Spider-Man: Far From Home (2019) and Spider-Man: No Way Home (2021), the web series The Daily Bugle (2019-2023), and the Sony's Spider-Man Universe film Venom: Let There Be Carnage (2021).

On television, he is known for playing Dr. Emil Skoda on the NBC series Law & Order, white supremacist prisoner Vernon Schillinger on the HBO series Oz, and Assistant Police Chief Will Pope on TNT's The Closer. From 2017 to 2019, he starred as Howard Silk in the Starz series Counterpart. He has also appeared in a series of commercials for Farmers Insurance and starred in the third season of the IFC comedy series Brockmire. In 2020, he had recurring roles on the miniseries Defending Jacob and The Stand. In 2022, he played the lead role in the Amazon Prime Video science fiction series Night Sky.

As a voice artist, he is known for voicing Cave Johnson in the video game Portal 2 (2011) and its spin-off Aperture Desk Job (2022), Tenzin in The Legend of Korra (2012–2014), Stanford "Ford" Pines in Gravity Falls (2015–2016), Kai in Kung Fu Panda 3 (2016), Mayor Leodore Lionheart in Zootopia (2016), the titular character in Klaus (2019), Pig Baby in Season 4 of the HBO Max animated series Infinity Train (2021), Nolan “Omni-Man” Grayson in the Amazon Prime Video animated series Invincible (2021), and Captain Putty in Chip 'n Dale: Rescue Rangers (2022). He has also been voicing the Yellow M&M since 1996.

Early life and education
Simmons was born on January 9, 1955, in Grosse Pointe, Michigan, a suburb of Detroit, the son of Patricia (née Kimble), an administrator, and Donald William Simmons, a music teacher at Parcells Middle School. One of three children, Simmons attended Ferry Elementary School in Grosse Pointe Woods. In 1965, when he was 10 years old, his family moved to Worthington, Ohio, a suburb of Columbus, Ohio. From 1970 to 1972, he attended Worthington High School, where he participated in drama, football and choir. In 1973, when he was 18, they moved to Missoula, Montana, where his father became director of the School of Music at the University of Montana. The younger Simmons graduated from the University of Montana in 1978 with a Bachelor of Arts degree in music. During college, he became a member of the music-oriented fraternity Phi Mu Alpha Sinfonia. Simmons appeared at the Bigfork Summer Playhouse in Bigfork, Montana in various roles from 1977 to 1982. Later, he moved to Seattle and became a member of the Seattle Repertory Theatre, where he met his best friend Michael Smith. Simmons made his way up in the acting world from there, eventually landing a role on Broadway in 1992.

Career

Stage
On Broadway, Simmons played Benny Southstreet in the 1992 revival of Guys and Dolls. In 1994, he sang multiple roles in the Wagner opera satire Das Barbecü. He also played the role of Jigger in a revival of Carousel with the Houston Grand Opera and starred in the 1987 Off-Broadway musical Birds of Paradise. During his time on Broadway, Simmons also played Captain Hook in Peter Pan (1991–1992).

Film and television roles
Simmons made his first appearance in a live action television role in the show Popeye Doyle, appearing as a patrol officer. The next year Simmons appeared on All My Children, as an RCMP sergeant. Among his more notable roles are Dr. Emil Skoda, a police psychiatrist whom Simmons played on three of the four incarnations of Law & Order and New York Undercover, and sadistic neo-Nazi inmate Vernon Schillinger on the prison drama Oz.

He starred in the science fiction thriller Counterpart from 2017 to 2019, playing dual roles as Howard Silk and Howard Silk Prime.

He appeared as Ralph Earnhardt, the father of race-car driver Dale Earnhardt, in 3: The Dale Earnhardt Story, and also made appearances as Will Pope, Assistant Chief of the LAPD, in the series The Closer. In the show Raising Hope, he plays Burt Chance's brother Bruce Chance. In a precursor to joining the Law & Order cast as Skoda, Simmons appeared in Homicide: Life on the Street, portraying a criminal in a Law & Order cross-over episode. Other roles include that of an army general in the television sitcom Arrested Development, and Dan the Barber in the surreal Nickelodeon series The Adventures of Pete & Pete in 1995.

He played B.R. in the film Thank You for Smoking (2005) and has been praised for his performance in Juno (2007) as "Mac" McGuff, the title character's father. Simmons played J. Jonah Jameson, editor-in-chief of the newspaper Daily Bugle, in all three of Sam Raimi's Spider-Man films, as well as in the expanded video game adaptation of Spider-Man 3. In 2008, he played a CIA superior in Burn After Reading and appeared in Postal as Candidate Welles. He also appeared in I Love You, Man as the father of Paul Rudd's character.

Throughout 2011 to 2018, Simmons was a prime time voice actor for the Adult Swim stop-motion series Robot Chicken. Simmons performed various voices for several characters over the last couple of years. For example, one of the characters that he played was Vernon Schillinger (in 2011) for a singular episode. In 2011 and 2014, he also made a surprise to fans as he voiced Master Chief for various scenes throughout two episodes. Lastly in 2018, he voiced the widely known J. Jonah Jameson for an episode.

Simmons starred in several films produced or directed by his friend Jason Reitman, including Thank You for Smoking, Juno, Up in the Air, and Jennifer's Body. In 2013, he had a small role as Mr. Jervis in Reitman's film Labor Day. He voices Tenzin, an Airbending master and the son of Aang and Katara, in the 2012 Nickelodeon series The Legend of Korra. He starred as blind lawyer "Mel Fisher" in Growing Up Fisher. From 2015 to 2016, he voiced the scientist Stanford Pines on the Disney XD cartoon series Gravity Falls.

In the 2014 drama film Whiplash, Simmons played Terence Fletcher, an intensely demanding bandleader at the fictional Shaffer Conservatory of Music, who bullies and cajoles his student, Andrew Neiman (Miles Teller). The wide acclaim for Simmons's performance included winning an Academy Award for Best Supporting Actor. Rolling Stone said "Beat the drums for an Oscar for Simmons." Richard Roeper of the Chicago Sun-Times said "Simmons delivers one of the most memorable performances of the year." Entertainment Weekly summed up the reaction by saying Simmons's performance "has been universally praised" and that he was "a leading contender for Best Supporting Actor." On January 11, 2015, Simmons won the Golden Globe Award for Best Supporting Actor – Motion Picture, and he went on to win the Academy Award for Best Supporting Actor on February 22, 2015.

In January 2015, Simmons was cast in a leading role in the film Kong: Skull Island, though he and Michael Keaton later exited the film. Simmons performed a substantial number of voice-over roles alongside his live action work. Several of these have arisen from his J. Jonah Jameson character in Raimi's Spider-Man films, including voices of two newspaper editors in episodes of the eighteenth season of The Simpsons. While unnamed, these characters are clearly meant to emulate Jameson (one, bearing Jameson's appearance, demands "pictures of Spider-Man," then once reminded he works at a poetry journal, demands "poems about Spider-Man"). Likewise, Simmons voiced an editor-in-chief of a newspaper (with Jameson's appearance and mannerisms) for a 2013 episode of The Hub's Pound Puppies. In 2015, he appeared as the German expatriate Sebastian in the Greek drama film Worlds Apart. In 2016, Simmons lent his voice to two animated films, voicing the antagonist Kai in Kung Fu Panda 3 and Mayor Lionheart in Zootopia.

Simmons reprised his role as the voice of J. Jonah Jameson in the animated series The Avengers: Earth's Mightiest Heroes, Ultimate Spider-Man, Avengers Assemble, and Hulk and the Agents of S.M.A.S.H.. In friend Reitman's film Young Adult, he voiced the protagonist's boss, via a series of voicemails. He also provided the voice of General Wade Eiling in Justice League Unlimited. He recorded an audiobook for Tom Clancy's Net Force: Point of Impact.

In 2016, Simmons portrayed Watertown Police Sergeant Jeffrey Pugliese in the film Patriots Day.

In 2017, Simmons portrayed Commissioner James Gordon in Joss Whedon's film Justice League, part of the DC Extended Universe. He reappeared in archive footage for Zack Snyder's Justice League, the 2021 director's cut. Simmons was set to reprise the role in the 2022 Batgirl film before its cancellation. He voiced himself in an episode of SuperMansion.

In the field of television commercials, Simmons is widely known for being the voice of the yellow M&M, a role he played from 1996 until 2013, replacing John Goodman. He has also done voice-over work for Norelco razors. In live-action, he is featured as Professor Nathaniel Burke of the University of Farmers in ads for Farmers Insurance Group, since 2010.

In 2017, Simmons had a small cameo for a role in SpongeBob SquarePants of Conductor Maestro Mackerel for an episode.

In 2019, Simmons reprised his role of J. Jonah Jameson in the Marvel Cinematic Universe film Spider-Man: Far From Home, as a cameo in the mid-credits scene. He is the second actor to portray the same character in both a non-MCU and MCU film, following Lou Ferrigno as the voice of the Hulk. He returns in the role in the 2019 web series The Daily Bugle and the films Venom: Let There Be Carnage and Spider-Man: No Way Home, both released in 2021.

In 2020, he had a guest spot as Frank Dillman on the police sitcom Brooklyn Nine-Nine. He also narrated the Netflix limited series documentary Coronavirus, Explained and co-starred in the critically acclaimed sci-fi/comedy Palm Springs, which premiered at the Sundance Film Festival in January and on Hulu in July.

From 2014 to 2020, Simmons voiced Lenny Turteltaub in the animated show BoJack Horseman.

In 2021, Simmons provided the voice for Omni-Man in the animated show Invincible, played the role of George Zax, CEO of a family-owned and operated pharmaceutical company on the fourth season of Goliath, and also appeared in the military science-fiction film The Tomorrow War.

In 2021, Simmons was the voice of Tusk Johnson, Mountain Man in the animated show The Great North.

In 2021, Simmons portrayed William Frawley in the Amazon movie Being the Ricardos, for which he received his second Academy Award nomination.

Video games
In 2005, Simmons also reprised his role of J. Jonah Jameson, as a voice actor, for the PSP version of Spider-Man 2: The Video Game. Later in 2007, he also voiced the same character of Jameson in the next game of the series: Spider-Man 3: The Video Game. Simmons, also in 2007, decided to voice Jameson one last time in Stern Pinball: Spider-Man.

Simmons appears as the anti-communist U.S. President Howard T. Ackerman in the video game Command & Conquer: Red Alert 3 and for a series of promotional advertisements parodying the 2008 presidential elections. In these advertisements, he offers himself (as Ackerman) as an alternative to other, unnamed presidential candidates and uses the slogan "Vote for me, if you want to live".

In 2011, Simmons also appeared in Generator Rex: Agent of Providence, as White Knight.

In April 2011, he appeared in Portal 2 as the voice of Aperture Science founder Cave Johnson, a performance that was lauded as the "surprise star turn" of the game. He reprised his role as Cave Johnson in the 2015 video game Lego Dimensions, and the 2022 video game Aperture Desk Job.

Simmons provided the voice-over for the M&M's "spokescandy", Yellow in M&M's: Shell Shocked and M&M's: The Lost Formulas.

Personal life
Simmons and his wife, Michelle Schumacher, have two children. Their daughter, Olivia Simmons, has appeared in two films, The Only Good Indian (2009) and I'm Not Here (2017). His son Joe Simmons has also made occasional appearances in low-budget films. Simmons admits in an interview that he encouraged their interest in acting.

Simmons is an avid fan of the Detroit Tigers. He threw the ceremonial first pitch for the Tigers on April 6, 2015 for Opening Day, and played the Tigers' manager in For Love of the Game (1999). He is also a fan of the Ohio State Buckeyes, having spent his formative years in Ohio.

He is a member of Phi Mu Alpha Sinfonia, the men's music fraternity, and was initiated in 1975 at the University of Montana.

During Mardi Gras 2018, he was appointed King of Bacchus by the Krewe of Bacchus.

Filmography

Awards

References

External links

 
 
 

1955 births
Living people
American male film actors
American male musical theatre actors
American male stage actors
American male television actors
American male voice actors
Best Supporting Actor AACTA International Award winners
Best Supporting Actor Academy Award winners
Best Supporting Actor BAFTA Award winners
Best Supporting Actor Golden Globe (film) winners
Independent Spirit Award for Best Supporting Male winners
Male actors from Michigan
Male actors from Montana
Male actors from Ohio
Outstanding Performance by a Male Actor in a Supporting Role Screen Actors Guild Award winners
People from Grosse Pointe, Michigan
People from Missoula, Montana
People from Worthington, Ohio
University of Montana alumni
20th-century American male actors
21st-century American male actors